The 2016 Nova Scotia Scotties Tournament of Hearts, the provincial women's curling championship of Nova Scotia, was held from January 19 to 24 at the Mayflower Curling Club in Halifax. The winning Jill Brothers team represented Nova Scotia at the 2016 Scotties Tournament of Hearts in Grande Prairie, Alberta.

Teams
Teams are as follows:

Round robin standings

Results

January 19
Draw 1
Jones 10-2 McEvoy
Brothers 10-3 Pinkney
Arsenault 9-5 Gamble
Dwyer 7-4 Breen

January 20
Draw 2
Arsenault 5-4 Pinkney
Jones 8-6 Dwyer
Breen 10-7 McEvoy
Brothers 8-4 Gamble

Draw 3
Breen 9-4 Gamble
Arsenault 11-10 McEvoy
Brothers 6-5 Dwyer
Jones 6-3 Pinkney

January 21
Draw 4
Arsenault 7-5 Brothers
Jones 8-7 Breen
Pinkney 10-8 Gamble
Dwyer 7-5 McEvoy

Draw 5
Gamble 8-2 Jones
Brothers 7-6 McEvoy
Arsenault 7-5 Dwyer
Breen 9-8 Pinkney

January 22
Draw 6
Breen 8-7 Brothers
Gamble 7-4 Dwyer
McEvoy 9-3 Pinkney
Arsenault 9-3 Jones

Draw 7
Dwyer 7-3 Pinkney
Breen 10-5 Arsenault
Brothers 8-6 Jones
Gamble 6-5 McEvoy

Playoffs

Semifinal
Saturday, January 22, 2:00pm

Final
Sunday, January 23, 10:00am

References

2016 Scotties Tournament of Hearts
Curling competitions in Halifax, Nova Scotia
2016 in Nova Scotia
January 2016 sports events in Canada